The fruit sector in Azerbaijan is a developing industry. The sector covered 171,600 ha. of land in 2016. Grape, apple, orange, pear and pomegranate are one of the major crops in fruit production in Azerbaijan.

Statistics 
Between 2000 and 2016, the area for fruit cultivation has grown 2-3% per year. The area of fruit and berries cultivation areas has increased over the time, while area for grape production stayed more or less the same. The area for hazelnut cultivation has increased by double.

Most of the areas for cultivation of fruits and berries are privately owned. Agricultural enterprises cover 7% of the fruit and berries area. Approximately 30% of grape production area is used by agricultural enterprises.

Import and Exports 
In 2014, due to improvement of irrigation systems and provision of subsidies and incentives to farmers, the production of fruit and berries increased, and imports were decreased.

Hazelnut 
Shaki-Zagatala economic region accounts for 74 percent of hazelnut production. In 2005-2015, hazelnut gardens in Azerbaijan increased by 12 thousand 358 hectares, and average yield from one hectare dropped by 21%. The highest indicator in this period was registered in Shaki-Zagatala economic region. Thus, hazelnuts production increased by 5.6 percent in the region and 36.3 percent in the planting of gardens.

According to the Presidential Decree of November 16, 2016 "On additional measures for the strengthening of state support for the development of silkworm and nutrition" more than 10 thousand hectares of new hazelnut bins were laid. Taking into account the prospects for the development of bush fruits, the draft State Program on the development of nuts such as almond, almond, walnut and chestnut in 2017-2026 is being developed. The project envisages further strengthening of the work carried out in this direction and increase the area of hazelnuts by 42 thousand hectares to 80 thousand hectares.

Citrus fruits 
The basis for the development of citrus fruits in Azerbaijan is the creation of the subtropical plant caves in the Astara region in the 1930s with a total area of 800 hectares, and about 500 hectares of lemon, tangerine, orange, feijoa, tea, noble bay, etc. cultivation of plants has begun.

Since 1930, the planned expansion of citrus fruits in the country has begun, the development of which has accelerated in the 1970s and 1980s. During this period, along with other subtropical plants in the region, the areas of citrus were expanded.

The total area of citrus gardens in the country in 2017 increased by 1.9 times to 3191.2 hectares compared to 2010, while production increased by 2.2 times to 42.8 thousand tons. In 2017, Azerbaijan exported 30.6 thousand tons of citrus fruits, including 12.6 thousand tons of oranges, 11.9 thousand tons of lemon, 4.6 thousand tons of mandarins, 1.5 thousand tons of grapefruit and other citrus fruits have been imported.

Order No. 3227 of the President of the Republic of Azerbaijan dated September 12, 2017 "On Additional Measures Related to the Development of Citrus, Tea and Paddy Production in the Republic of Azerbaijan" has created for the development of citrus fruits.

Grape 
In 1980s, grape was one of the main fruit products in Azerbaijan. The production of grape has been increasing year by year due to reforms and state programs to develop viticulture in Azerbaijan.

Apple 
Apple orchards covers about 22,000 hectares of the Guba-Khachmaz economic region. In 2017, 120,757 tons of apple harvested in Guba. 65-70 % of apple have been exported in 2017. In general, 40,000 tons of apples have been exported from Guba-Khachmaz region.

Apple was the second most important exported fruit in 2008, while it was in the fourth ranks in 2012. The value of exported apple was 49,287 thousand USD in 2008, 30,071 thousand USD in 2009, 14,436 thousand USD in 2010, 19,296 thousand USD in 2011, and 27,595 thousand USD in 2012.

Pomegranates 
Pomegranates were the third most produced fruit in 2012, which was 141.6 thousand tons. In 2014, production of pomegranates was 153,423 tons, which of 121, 654 tons (79%) were produced in Aran economic region. The production of pomegranates is higher in Lankaran, Nakhchivan, and Ganja-Gazakh economic regions.

Fruit growing by economic regions

Guba-Khachmaz 
Majority of fruit cultivation in Guba-Khachmaz economic region is seedy fruits. Khachmaz, Guba, and Gusar are the most fruit-cultivated areas in the region. The main fruits species include apple, pear, plum, cherry, peach, nuts, dates, walnut, cranberries, cherries, figs, medlar, and olives.

Sheki- Zakatala 
In Sheki-Zakatala walnuts, hazelnuts, chestnuts, cornel, cherry, apple, loquat, quince, fig, cranberry, and pear are cultivated. Gakh, Zakatala, Balakan, Oguz, and Sheki are the main fruit producers in the region. The region contributes 95% of nuts production.

Nakhchivan Autonomous Republic 
In this economic region, stony fruits such as peach and apricot, and almond, pear, walnut, quince, apple, cherry, and oleaster are produced.

Aran 
This economic region mainly produces dry sub-tropical fruits such as pomegranate and quince. Other fruit crops that are produced in this region are jujube, medlar, dates, plum, fig, walnut, cherries, and apricot.

Lankaran 
Lankaran mainly cultivates citrus fruits. Orange, mandarin, kiwi, feijoa, lemon, fig, nuts, and medlar are cultivated in this region.

Absheron 
The peninsula mainly produces olive, pistachio, almond and fig.

Developments in the sector 
On February 13, an order on "Approval of the State Program for the Development of Citrus Fruit in the Republic of Azerbaijan for 2018-2025" prepared in accordance with the Presidential Decree No. 3227 of 12 September 2017 "On Additional Measures to Develop Citrus, Tea and Paddy Production in the Republic of Azerbaijan". Upon the order, the Ministry of Finance and the Ministry of Economy must take the necessary measures to ensure that the state budget and the state investment programs are prepared in accordance with the annual budget. The Ministry of Agriculture shall coordinate the implementation of the measures envisaged by the State Program and inform the President of the Republic of Azerbaijan about the implementation of the State Program once a year. The Cabinet of Ministers is instructed to address issues arising from the order. 

As a result of implementation of the State Program, it is planned to increase the production of citrus in Azerbaijan up to 100 thousand tons before 2025. The plan of measures on the development of citrus fruits in the State Program for 2018-2025 envisages involvement of local and foreign investments into citrus fruit production and processing. At the same time, according to the Action Plan, existing standards in the citrus industry should be brought into line with international requirements; small-scale farmers and farmers operating in this area should be encouraged to cooperate on voluntary cooperation; contacts with foreign companies with progressive production and export experience should be enhanced and a progressive insurance mechanism should be established. It also envisages strengthening of scientific support and staffing capacity in the field of citrus fruits, improvement of infrastructure provision, state support measures, strengthening of marketing activity and export promotion.

See also 
Agriculture in Azerbaijan

Ministry of Agriculture (Azerbaijan)

References 

Edible fruits
Agriculture in Azerbaijan